Girawa, also known as Bagasin (Begasin, Begesin), is a Papuan language of Papua New Guinea.

References

Kokon languages
Languages of Madang Province